A. Pratt Kessler (April 26, 1905 – October 13, 1984) was an American politician who served as the United States Attorney for the District of Utah from 1953 to 1961 and as the Attorney General of Utah from 1961 to 1965.

He died of cardiac arrest on October 13, 1984, in Salt Lake City, Utah at age 79.

References

1905 births
1984 deaths
United States Attorneys for the District of Utah
Utah Attorneys General
Utah Republicans